Election to the 6th convocation of the Moscow City Duma took place on the United Voting Day on September 14, 2014. The elections were held in full by the majority system, 45 deputies were elected in 45 single-member constituencies (previously there were 35 deputies in the Duma) out of 258 candidates. The term of the new Duma will be five years. The elections were held on September 14 on more than 3,500 ballots in the city. The final results were announced on September 16, 2014.

17 deputies from the previous City Duma retained their seats. After processing 100% of the ballots, the leaders of the vote were: 28 people nominated by the United Russia party, 5 by the Communist Party, 1 by the LDPR, 1 by Rodina, and 10 by self-nominees supported by United Russia.

Background
The elections to the Moscow City Duma in 2014 have a number of innovations in comparison with the previous ones:

There was a transition from a mixed to a completely single-mandate system of formation of the Moscow City Duma .

The scheme for the election of the Moscow City Duma only in single-mandate constituencies was previously used from 1993 to 2001.
The number of deputies with a decrease in their status is increasing. Three quarters of deputies will work on a non-permanent basis. The initiative was strengthened by allowing also to combine the senator's post in the Federation Council from Moscow and the Moscow City Duma deputy.

There was an abolition of absentee certificates on the initiative of Sergei Sobyanin. At the same time, this innovation coincided with the return to the regional elections of early voting.

The primaries "My Moscow" were held. As a result, in 45 districts, the party of power, United Russia, nominated only 32 candidates from its ranks, the rest of the public from the primaries. In one district, "United Russia" did not nominate its candidate.
Video surveillance in the elections of the City Duma has not been used before. For the first time, cameras were installed in the ballots.

Rumors about early elections
In September 2013, Moscow's territorial election commissions began to receive information that elections could be postponed from September to March 2014. For this, allegedly in December 2013 MHD V convocation was to self-dissolve, but this did not happen.

References

Legislative elections in Moscow
2014 elections in Russia
2014 in Moscow